Megachile pugillatoria is a species of bee in the family Megachilidae. It was described by Costa in 1863.

References

Pugillatoria
Insects described in 1863